United Nations Security Council Resolution 1693, adopted unanimously on June 30, 2006, after recalling all previous resolutions concerning the situation in the Democratic Republic of the Congo, including resolutions 1565 (2004), 1592 (2005), 1596 (2005), 1621 (2005), 1628 (2005), 1635 (2005) and 1671 (2006), the Council extended the temporary increase in the size of the United Nations Mission in the Democratic Republic of Congo (MONUC) until September 30, 2006.

Resolution

Observations
The Security Council emphasised the importance of elections as part of the long term stability and peace in the Democratic Republic of the Congo. It noted that elections had taken place to the National Assembly and paid tribute to donor countries that had assisted in this process.

Meanwhile, there was a need for reform of the security sector and concern at hostilities between militia and foreign groups in the east of the country. The situation as a whole continued to constitute a threat to international peace and security in the region.

Acts
Acting under Chapter VII of the United Nations Charter, the Council extended the increase in number of military and civilian personnel for three months until the end of September 2006, reiterating the temporary nature of the increase and expressing its will to downsize when its presence would no longer be necessary.

Meanwhile, the resolution reminded the Democratic Republic of the Congo on the importance of free and fair elections and to refrain from incitement to hatred and violence. MONUC was able to assist the Congolese authorities and the European Union's EUSEC mission in the country.

See also
 Kivu conflict
 Ituri conflict
 List of United Nations Security Council Resolutions 1601 to 1700 (2005–2006)
 Second Congo War

References

External links
 
Text of the Resolution at undocs.org

 1693
2006 in the Democratic Republic of the Congo
 1693
June 2006 events